Landes, or Lanas in Gascon, means moorland or heath.
Landes and Lanas come from the Latin plānus meaning “‘flat, even, level, plain’”. They are therefore cognate with the English plain (and plane), the Spanish word llanos and the Italian word piano.

Places
Landes (department), a department of France
Landes forest or Landes of Gascony, a natural region in the southwest of France
Landes, Charente-Maritime, a commune in the Charente-Maritime département
Landes, West Virginia, United States
Landes-sur-Ajon
Saint-Hilaire-des-Landes, Brittany
Rion-des-Landes
Centre d'Essais des Landes, launch site for testing military rockets

Other uses
Landes (surname)

See also
 Cantons of the Landes department
 Arrondissements of the Landes department
 Communes of the Landes department
 Saint-Sulpice-des-Landes (disambiguation)